Henry Drisler (27 December 1818 – 30 November 1897) was an American classical scholar.

Life
He was born on Staten Island, New York. Drisler graduated at Columbia College in 1839, taught classics in the Columbia grammar school for four years, and was then appointed tutor in classics in the college. In 1845 he became adjunct professor of Latin and Greek there, in 1857 was appointed to the new separate chair of Latin language and literature, and ten years later succeeded Dr. Charles Anthon as Jay Professor of Greek Language and Literature. He was acting president in 1867 and in 1888–1889, and from 1890 to his retirement as professor emeritus in 1894 was dean of the School of Arts, as the undergraduate division of Columbia was known at the time. (For this reason, some Columbia scholars consider him, and not John Howard Van Amringe, to have been the first dean of Columbia College.) He died in New York City in 1897.

Dr. Drisler completed and supplemented Dr. Anthon's labors as an editor of classical texts. His criticisms and corrections of Liddell and Scott's A Greek–English Lexicon, of which he brought out revised American editions from 1846. He revised and augmented the seventh edition (1883) for an American one (1889) which won his name a place on the title-page of the eighth British edition in 1897. In 1870 he published a revised and enlarged edition of Yonge's English-Greek Lexicon. His revisions are also part of the history of the work that is currently available as Lewis and Short's A Latin Dictionary.

Dr. Drisler ardently opposed slavery. In 1863, he wrote a brilliant refutation of  Episcopal Bishop John Henry Hopkins' book the Bible View of Slavery by John H. Hopkins, D. D., Bishop of the Diocese of Vermont: Examined by Henry Drisler. The refutation relied completely on the Bible and displayed Dr. Drisler's wide range of scholarship.

References

Attribution

External links
 

1818 births
1897 deaths
American lexicographers
American classical scholars
Columbia College (New York) alumni
Classical scholars of Columbia University
Classical philologists
Presidents of Columbia University
19th-century lexicographers